Admiral Charles Gauntlett Dicken (26 April 1854 – 7 September 1937) was a Royal Navy officer. He was Commodore-in-Charge, Hong Kong (HMS Tamar) from 1904 to 1905, during the Russo-Japanese War.

His son Rear-Admiral E. B. C. Dicken, CBE, DSC also reached flag rank in the Royal Navy.

His papers are held at the University of Cambridge.

References 

1854 births
1937 deaths
Royal Navy admirals
Place of birth missing
Place of death missing